The fourth and final season of the American television series Black Lightning, which is based on the DC Comics character Jefferson Pierce / Black Lightning, premiered on The CW on February 8, 2021. The season is produced by Berlanti Productions, Akil Productions, Warner Bros. Television, and DC Entertainment. It is set in the Arrowverse, sharing continuity with the other television series of the franchise. The season was ordered in January 2020 and production began that October, with Salim Akil once again serving as showrunner.

The season continues to follow Jefferson, now a high school principal in his second stint as the superhero Black Lightning, as he fights against local corruption in his community of Freeland. Cress Williams stars as Jefferson, along with principal cast members China Anne McClain, Nafessa Williams, Marvin "Krondon" Jones III, Christine Adams, Jordan Calloway, and James Remar also returning from previous seasons. Laura Kariuki replaces McClain as Jennifer Pierce starting with the fifth episode "The Book of Ruin: Chapter One: Picking Up the Pieces"; McClain, however, returns for the series finale.

Episodes

Cast and characters

Main
 Cress Williams as Jefferson Pierce / Black Lightning
 China Anne McClain as Jennifer Pierce / Lightning (episodes 1–4 & 13)
 Laura Kariuki as The Ionosphere / Jennifer "JJ Stewart" Pierce / Lightning (episodes 5–13; recurring)
 Nafessa Williams as Anissa Pierce / Thunder / Blackbird
 Christine Adams as Lynn Stewart
 Marvin "Krondon" Jones III as Tobias Whale
 Jordan Calloway as Khalil Payne / Painkiller 
 Chantal Thuy as Grace Choi / Wylde
 James Remar as Peter Gambi

Recurring
 William Catlett as Latavius "Lala" Johnson
 Rafael Castillo as Devonte Jones
 Melissa De Sousa as Chief Ana Lopez
 Tommy Kane as John Webb
 Bethann Hardison as Dr. Bowlan
 Todd Anthony as Dr. Darius Morgan
 Kedrick Brown as Marcel Payton
 Jemarcus Kilgore as Montel
 Robert Tinsley as Homeless Mam
 Elena Varela as Lauren Caruso
 Wallace Smith as Detective Hassan Shakur
 Helen Joo Lee as Val Seong
 Matt Roszak as Red
 Christopher A'mmanuel as Baron / T.C.

Guest
 Reggie Hayes as Mayor Billy Black
 Jason Louder as Frank "Two-Bits" Tanner
 Teesha Renee as Destiny
 Veronika Rowe as Auntie Gina
 Renell Gibbs as Kyrie
 Kelvin Hair as Lydell Green
 Amanda Baker as Rebecca Larson
 Tre' Stokes as Terry Andrews
 Sh'Kia Augustin as the voice of Shonda
 Paden Fallis as Marshall Bates
 Troy Faruk as Deputy Chief Wesley Robinson
 Rico Ball as Ishmael
 Bill Duke as Agent Odell
 Alexander Hodge as Philky
 James Roch as Donald
 Sibongile Mlambo as Maya Odell
 Fantastic Negrito as Fantastic Negrito Hologram
 McKalin Hand as Uriah Coleman
 Jamal Akakpo as Kevin Mason
 Kenneth Trujillo as Jesse Gentilucci
 Will Blagrove as Keith Michaels
 Sofia Vassilieva as Looker
 Jef Holbrook as Party Pic Guy

Production

Development
On January 7, 2020, The CW renewed the series for its fourth season. On the early renewal of Black Lightning as well as other series, network president Mark Pedowitz released a statement reading, "These early orders for next season give our production teams a head start in plotting out story arcs and a jump on hiring staff, and this also provides us with a strong foundation of established, fan-favorite CW shows to build on for next season." On November 20, 2020, The CW confirmed that the fourth season will be the final season of the series.

Casting
Main cast members Cress Williams, China Anne McClain, Nafessa Williams, Christine Adams, Marvin "Krondon" Jones III, Jordan Calloway, and James Remar return from previous seasons as Jefferson Pierce / Black Lightning, Jennifer Pierce / Lightning, Anissa Pierce / Thunder, Lynn Stewart, Tobias Whale, Khalil Payne / Painkiller, and Peter Gambi, respectively. This is the first season to not feature Damon Gupton as Billy Henderson. In January 2020, Gupton revealed that Henderson was not in the plans for the fourth season and that the third season would be his last as a series regular. McClain appeared in a limited number of episodes, as she planned to leave the series after the season, ahead of it being announced to be the final season. This led to the fifth episode to have her character recast to Laura Kariuki. McClain, however, returned for the finale.

In November 2020, Chantal Thuy, who portrays Grace Choi, was promoted to a series regular for the fourth season.

Filming
Filming began in mid-October 2020.

Release
The fourth season premiered on February 8, 2021. After this, episodes began releasing weekly every Monday.

Reception

Ratings

References

External links

 

2021 American television seasons
Black Lightning (TV series) seasons